Wanted! Jane Turner is a 1936 American crime drama film directed by Edward Killy from a screenplay by Edmund L. Hartmann and John Twist, based on Twist's story. Produced by RKO Radio Pictures, it was premiered in New York City on November 27, 1936, with a national release the following week on December 4.  The film stars Lee Tracy and Gloria Stuart, with an extensive supporting cast.

Plot summary
Two postal detectives track the gang that robbed a mail truck and killed the driver.

Cast

 Lee Tracy as Tom Mallory
 Gloria Stuart as Doris Martin
 Ann Preston as Jane Turner (credited as Judith Blake)
 John McGuire as Jerry Turner
 Frank M. Thomas as Banks
 Paul Guilfoyle as Phil Crowley
 Irene Franklin as Ruby Winston
 Patricia Wilder as Babe
 Barbara Pepper as Marge Sanders, posing as Jane Turner
 Willard Robertson as Walter Davies
 Selmer Jackson as Ferris - Postal Inspector (uncredited)
 Thomas E. Jackson as Lansing - Postal Chief (uncredited)
 Lew Kelly as Mike - Plainclothesman (uncredited)
 Lee Kohlmar as John Taylor (uncredited)
 George Lloyd as Henchman Dutch Emory (uncredited)
 Arthur Loft as Henchman Glen (uncredited)
 Aileen Pringle as Norris' Secretary (uncredited)
 Bryant Washburn as Magee (uncredited)
 Pierre Watkin as Andrew Norris (uncredited)
 Paul Fix as Crowley's Henchman

References

External links
 
 
 
 

1936 crime drama films
1936 films
American crime drama films
RKO Pictures films
American black-and-white films
Films directed by Edward Killy
Films produced by Cliff Reid
1930s American films